Marcelo Machado dos Santos (born 29 May 1994) is a Brazilian footballer who currently plays as a midfielder for Operário Ferroviário.

Career statistics

Club

Notes

References

External links
Marcelo Santos at ZeroZero

1994 births
Living people
Brazilian footballers
Brazilian expatriate footballers
Association football forwards
Campeonato Brasileiro Série A players
Campeonato Brasileiro Série B players
Israeli Premier League players
Esporte Clube Vitória players
Maccabi Tel Aviv F.C. players
Bnei Yehuda Tel Aviv F.C. players
Botafogo de Futebol e Regatas players
C.D. Aves players
Guarani FC players
Brazilian expatriate sportspeople in Israel
Expatriate footballers in Israel
Brazilian expatriate sportspeople in Portugal
Expatriate footballers in Portugal